The Elevation of the Cross (also called The Raising of the Cross) is the name of two paintings, a very large triptych in oil on panel and a much smaller oil on paper painting. Both pieces were painted by the Flemish artist Peter Paul Rubens in Antwerp, Belgium, the original in 1610 and the latter in 1638.

The original is in the Cathedral of Our Lady, as the Catholic church for which it was painted has been destroyed. The smaller version is now in the Art Gallery of Ontario, Canada.  Another smaller triptych with a different composition, and an oil study, are in the Louvre in Paris.

Peter Paul Rubens painted the triptych The Elevation of the Cross after returning to Antwerp from Italy in 1610–1611 as commissioned by the church authorities of the Church of St. Walburga. Cornelis van der Geest, a wealthy merchant and churchwarden of the Catholic Church of St. Walburga, secured this commission for Rubens and funded the majority of the project. Under Napoleon's rule, the emperor took the painting, along with Peter Paul Rubens's The Descent from the Cross, to Paris. The paintings were returned to Antwerp in 1815, but since the Catholic Church of St. Walburga had been destroyed, they were placed in the Cathedral of Our Lady in Antwerp instead.

The Antwerp triptych was positioned above the high altar preceded by a set of stairs, making it visible from a great distance in the vast Gothic cathedral of St. Walburga. This height was unusual for an altarpiece indicating its important presence in St. Walburga. While Rubens' triptych was present in St. Walburga, the painting was surrounded on all sides by images of God the Father, Christ, angels, and at the top of the structure was a gilded wooden pelican, which was a common representation of Christ's redemptive sacrifice, based on the ancient legend that the pelican hacked his brood to death in a first rage, but then brought them back to life with his own blood.

Visual analysis 

This altarpiece is an early attempt by Ruben's to employ the intensity of the Baroque style. The three panels together work harmoniously, creating a continuous scene. The setting is dark and restless as the group of spectators, soldiers, horses, and the strained bodies of the executioners surround the soon-to-be crucified Christ.

Jesus Christ and the elevation of his cross are the focal points for this artwork, with features of the story overflowing from the middle panel onto the wings on both sides. The central panel illustrates a tension between the multitude of massively muscled men attempting to lift the cross and the seemingly unbearable weight of Christ on the cross. Christ's suffering is made apparent in his strained and tense body, hands clenched tight around the nails in his hands, and his head contorted in the last moments of agonizing pain. Jesus' body is a picture of classical nobility; with arms raised and gaze turned upward, Rubens emphasizes Christ's willing sacrifice over the horrors of his crucifixion. Christ looks up and asks his Father, who was depicted above the triptych, for forgiveness for his tormentors: "Father, forgive them, they know not what they do." (Luke 23:34)

The thieves in the right wing are being prepared for execution as the Roman officers issue their orders. In the left wing, the women on the road (Luke 23:28) respond to Christ's plea for forgiveness, reliving figure by figure the stages of repentance: fearfulness, contrition, hope, and charity toward the Savior. The Virgin and Saint John are identified above them, deeply moved, reflecting on the meaning of the raising of the cross and Christ's plea for forgiveness.

The Elevation of the Cross is an accurate biblical representation of the crucifixion of Christ, in keeping with the specific guidelines for art as produced by the Council of Trent. Rubens emanates the spirit of the catholic reform by representing the victorious nature of Christ's death while maintaining his divine nature. Rubens's visual argument on human sin, judgment, the elevation of the cross, the plea for forgiveness, and the acts of penitence, follows Johannes Herolt's collection of sermons from 1435, widely used in Rubens' time. Rubens contrasts the uniqueness of Christ's plea for forgiveness with quotations from ancient depictions of the vengeance of the gods (Laocoon, Niobids, Farnese Bull).

The high altar of St. Walburga rises high above an ancient Holy Sepulchre chapel restored in 1613. Thus, Rubens' "Erection of the Cross" reenacts the journey from the Jerusalem Church of the Holy Sepulchre to the erection of the Holy Cross in the Golgotha Chapel located above.

Rubens also paints the outside of the wings, illustrating four saints that were venerated in Flanders during this time period. On the far left stands St. Amandus clothed impressively in bishop robes, with St. Walburga positioned alongside him. On the right outer wing stands Saint Catherine of Alexandria, accompanied by Saint Eligius. On the socles, garlands of fruit announce the fruits that Christ's raising of the cross and plea for forgiveness earn for the believers.

Influences 

The work shows the clear influence of ancient sculptures (Laocoon, Niobids, Farnese Bull) and Italian Renaissance and Baroque artists such as Caravaggio, Tintoretto and Michelangelo. Peter Paul Rubens's foreshortening is evident in the contortions of the struggling, strapping men, which is reminiscent of Tintoretto's Crucifixion in the Scuola di San Rocco in Venice. Rubens's version creates a more compelling, intense and emotional response through the re-positioning of Christ. Christ cuts across the central panel diagonally, akin to Caravaggio's  Entombment where both descent and ascent are in play at a key moment. Rubens represents light with tenebrism, reflecting on the influence of Caravaggio. Christ's perfectly molded body alludes to the nude figures painted by Michelangelo on the ceilings of the Sistine Chapel.

The artists' workshop
Peter Paul Rubens was not fully responsible for the creation of this artwork, which is the reality for many of Rubens's paintings. The period after which Rubens arrived in Antwerp was a particularly busy time for the painter, and consisted of responsibilities beyond painting. Rubens was head of a workshop that consisted of a hierarchy of pupils, assistants, and collaborators – all of which played an important role in the creation of the painting. Rubens would have done all the sketches and designs for the works being created in his workshop.

In terms of the Elevation of the Cross, Rubens started the creative process with oil and brush on a small panel. Also called a modello, this oil sketch served as a sample painting for the patron to approve the overall story and imagery, especially paying attention to the iconographic details. The modello also served as a model for the assistants to start the preliminary steps of the full scale painting. No major iconographic changes were made in the case of Rubens's Elevation of the Cross, but a few details such as the position of the cross were adjusted. From the modello to the Antwerp triptych, Rubens exchanged the figure of a fleeing Niobid on the right wing for that of a son of Niobe lying on the ground. In the radical foreshortening of this figure he was able to demonstrate his mastery of art to the connoisseurs of his time.

Once the assistants had established the general composition, Rubens turned his attention towards the human figures. In this stage, Rubens used chalk to make drawings with live models present, positioning the models in the various poses as predetermined in the modello. These separate drawings were used in conjunction with the modello in the final execution of the large scale painting. Rubens made sure to touch up all the paintings once the assistants had completed their portion.

Smaller version
The Elevation of the Cross is also the title of a smaller oil on paper painting reproduction of the triptych. It measured 60 × 126.5 cm, but was later enlarged to 70 × 131.5 cm. This smaller painting is a representative of modified reproduction of the much earlier triptych. Also painted by Rubens, he completed the piece around 1638, and it was given to Hans Witdoeck, to use as a modello. The smaller painting is unique from the original, however, with the addition of color accents throughout the composition. The most notable difference seen between the 1611 painting and the 1638 painting is the elimination of the frames. The removal of the breaks created a more cohesive scene. Figures not seen in the earlier version are added, as well as some changes in the landscape. Due to its size, some have suggested the painting may have been conceived as an independent painting to The Elevation of the Cross, to be given as a personal gift to Cornelis van der Geest. The painting is now in the Art Gallery of Ontario's permanent collection, after it was purchased from George Holford in 1928.

Notes

References

 Belkin, Kristin (1998). Rubens. London, England: Phaidon Press. pp. 103–120.
 Dunton, Larkin (1896). The World and its People. Silver, Burdett. p. 164
 Heinen, Ulrich (1996). Rubens zwischen Predigt und Kunst. Der Hochaltar für die Walburgenkirche in Antwerpen. Weimar: Verlag und Datenbank fuer Geisteswissenschaften.
 Heinen, Ulrich (2016): "Die Erfindung des Barocktriptychons. Rubens’ Aktualisierung des Wandelbildes." In: Klappeffekte. Faltbare Bildträger in der Vormoderne, ed. by David Ganz and Marius Rimmele, Berlin: Reimer, pp. 337-365, particularly pp. 337-345.
 Lawrence, Cynthia (2005). "Rubens's Raising of the Cross in Context. The Early Christian Past and the Evocation of the Sacred in Post-Tridentine Antwerp." In: Defining the Holy Sacred space in medieval and early modern Europe, ed. by Andrew Spicer and Sarah Hamilton, London and New York, pp. 251–275.
 Martin, John (1969). Rubens: The Antwerp Altarpieces. New York, NY: Thames & Hudson Ltd. pp. 37–39.
 Wedgwood, C.V. (1967). The World of Rubens, 1577-1640. New York: Time Incorporated, New York. pp. 58,70.
 Wieseman, Majorie. (2004). Drawn by the Brush: Oil Sketches by Peter Paul Rubens. Yale University Press. p. 248.

1611 paintings
1638 paintings
Collections of the Art Gallery of Ontario
Rubens
Horses in art
Paintings by Peter Paul Rubens
Paintings depicting Mary Magdalene
Paintings in the Cathedral of Our Lady (Antwerp)
Triptychs
Dogs in art